Pushkari is the name of several rural localities in Russia:
Pushkari, Bryansk Oblast, a village in Moskovsky Selsoviet of Pochepsky District of Bryansk Oblast
Pushkari, Kirov, Kirov Oblast, a village under the administrative jurisdiction of Oktyabrsky City District of the City of Kirov, Kirov Oblast
Pushkari, Slobodskoy District, Kirov Oblast, a village in Shestakovsky Rural Okrug of Slobodskoy District of Kirov Oblast
Pushkari, Lipetsk Oblast, a selo in Pushkarsky Selsoviet of Usmansky District of Lipetsk Oblast
Pushkari, Mari El Republic, a village in Pektubayevsky Rural Okrug of Novotoryalsky District of the Mari El Republic
Pushkari, Perm Krai, a village in Nytvensky District of Perm Krai
Pushkari, Ryazan Oblast, a selo in Shchetininsky Rural Okrug of Mikhaylovsky District of Ryazan Oblast
Pushkari, Smolensk Oblast, a village in Loinskoye Rural Settlement of Smolensky District of Smolensk Oblast
Pushkari, Tambov Oblast, a selo in Streletsky Selsoviet of Tambovsky District of Tambov Oblast
Pushkari, Kireyevsky District, Tula Oblast, a village in Dedilovsky Rural Okrug of Kireyevsky District of Tula Oblast
Pushkari, Novomoskovsky District, Tula Oblast, a village in Krasnobogatyrsky Rural Okrug of Novomoskovsky District of Tula Oblast
Pushkari, Yefremovsky District, Tula Oblast, a village in Pushkarsky Rural Okrug of Yefremovsky District of Tula Oblast
Pushkari, Udmurt Republic, a village in Pushkarevsky Selsoviet of Yakshur-Bodyinsky District of the Udmurt Republic